Idrettslaget Norild is a Norwegian association football club based in Vadsø.

They play home games at Vadsø Stadion. They currently play in the Third Division (fourth tier). It last played in the Second Division in 1994. The club is exclusively engaged with football, and is the largest football club in Vadsø. They have approximately 300 members, of which 260 are active players. Sigurd Rushfeldt, Morten Gamst Pedersen and Steffen Nystrøm are notable former players.

References

External links
Official club pages
Speaker.no

Football clubs in Norway
Vadsø
Sport in Finnmark
Association football clubs established in 1935
1935 establishments in Norway